Ol' Waylon Sings Ol' Hank is an album by the American country music artist Waylon Jennings, released on the singer's own label, WJ Records, in 1992.

Background
As the title suggests, it features Jennings' performances of songs written or made famous by Hank Williams. The album was recorded and mixed by Rodney Good and produced by Jennings in 1992 at Eleven Eleven Sound Studios in Nashville, Tennessee. Very few copies of the release were ever pressed, making the original album extremely rare today. In his autobiography Jennings recalls, "I felt chills all over me the first time I heard Hank Williams sing 'Lost Highway.' I would stay up late on Saturday night listening for him, happy if I could just hear him speak. I always wanted to be a singer, but he etched it in stone," and admits, "Musically, Hank Williams was my centerpost. It's always gone back to him, the one who did everything wrong and everything right."

Jennings also cited Williams as a critical interest on the Outlaw movement:

"If I had an Outlaw hero, someone to set my standard and measure my progress, it was Hank Williams...Everything I did, anything anyone did, was measured against Hank's long, lanky shadow.  You'd hear these stories, how he pulled a jukebox that didn't have his records on it out to the street and shot it full of holes, or ran around all night dead drunk and pilled out and still gave the greatest show you ever saw.  We thought that was the way you did it...I wanted to be like him."

In 2006, the record was reissued on YMC Records as Waylon Sings Hank Williams with a new cover and a bonus track of Jennings reminiscing on his past.

Reception
AllMusic wrote, "The influence of the latter on the former was obvious not merely in style, but in the manner in which both vanguards forged rebellious paths. On Waylon Sings Hank Williams, Jennings pays tender tribute to many of the master's classics such as "Jambalaya" and "I'm So Lonesome I Could Cry," along with lesser known tracks like "Why Should We Try Anymore.""

Track listing
All songs written by Hank Williams except as noted.
"Jambalaya (on the Bayou)" – 2:56
"Half as Much" (Curley Williams) – 2:12
"I'm So Lonesome I Could Cry" – 2:07
"Blues Come Around" – 2:18
"Why Should We Try Anymore" – 2:13
"Be Careful of the Stones That You Throw" (Bonnie Dodd) – 2:18
"I Won't Be Home No More" – 2:43
"A Mansion on the Hill" (Hank Williams, Fred Rose) – 2:50
"Hey Good Lookin'" – 1:53
"Cold Cold Heart" – 3:26
"Honky Tonkin'" – 2:08
"They'll Never Take Her Love from Me" (Leon Payne) – 2:36

Bonus track
"Waylon Speaks" – 5:26

References

External links
[ Allmusic entry on Waylon Sings Hank Williams]

Waylon Jennings albums
1992 albums
2006 albums